In Greek mythology, Carius or Karios (Ancient Greek: Κάριος) was the son of Zeus and Torrhebia. His mother's name is connected to Torrhebos, name of a city in Lydia. According to Hellanicus, there was a mountain named Karios (Carius) near this city, with the sanctuary of Carius situated on it. Nicolaus Damascenus related of him the following tale.

Mythology 
As Carius was wandering by a lake which later received the name Torrhebis, he heard the voices of nymphs singing; these nymphs, Nicolaus remarked, were also called the Muses by the Lydians. Carius learned the music from them, and taught it to the Lydians. This kind of music was known as "Torrhebian songs".

Carius ("of Caria") was also a surname of Zeus himself, under which he was venerated in Mylasa.

See also
List of Greek mythological figures

Notes

References 

 Herodotus, The Histories with an English translation by A. D. Godley. Cambridge. Harvard University Press. 1920. . Online version at the Topos Text Project. Greek text available at Perseus Digital Library.
 Stephanus of Byzantium, Stephani Byzantii Ethnicorum quae supersunt, edited by August Meineike (1790-1870), published 1849. A few entries from this important ancient handbook of place names have been translated by Brady Kiesling. Online version at the Topos Text Project.

Children of Zeus
Epithets of Zeus